Gujrat may refer to any of the following places:

India
 Gujarat, a state in western India
 Gujarat Subah, a former Mughal imperial province

Pakistan 
 Gujrat, Pakistan, a city in Pakistan's Punjab Province
 Gujrat Division, an administrative division
 Gujrat District, an administrative district
 Gujrat Tehsil, an administrative division
 Gujrat-I, Gujrat-II, Gujrat-III, and Gujrat-IV, parliamentary constituencies

See also 
 Gujarati (disambiguation), notably language